K. R. Indira Devi (1949–2017), born as Indira Devi, was an Indian actress who was active in Tamil Cinema during the latter half of the 20th century. She was well known for her supporting roles, but was also a successful dubbing artist. In a career spanning close to five decades, she acted in more than 250 films in the Tamil, Telugu, Kannada and Malayalam. Indira debuted as heroine in Konjum Kumari (1963). She was awarded the Kalaimamani by Government of Tamil Nadu.

Early life 
Indira Devi was born in the Kanchipuram district. At the age of 14, she moved to Chennai and joined drama troupe and began  performance in stage plays. Then she entered film industry and started her career in Supporting role. In 1959, she acted with Kann Thirandhathu starring Mynavathi under the direction of K. V. Srinivasan produced by Narayanan Companies and she was the onscreen pair for A. Karunanidhi. She made her acting debut as heroine with Konjum Kumari starring R. S. Manohar and Manorama under the direction of G. Viswanathan and produced by Modern Theatres in 1963. Indira was the onscreen pair for M. N. Nambiar in MGR's Petralthan Pillaiya (1966), Gemini Ganesan in Sumaithaangi (1962) and M. R. Radha in Hello Mister Zamindar (1965). She starred with Sivaji Ganesan, and Sivakumar. She acted in more than 250 films in the Tamil and other Indian languages, the notable ones being Kandhan Karunai, Sindhu Bhairavi, and with superstar Rajinikanth in films such as  Mannan, and Panakkaran. Her last film was Girivalam (2005) where she played Granny to Richard Rishi. Indira acted in many television serials, and worked as a dubbing artist in more than 500 films.

Other works 
Indira also worked as a heroine in the film Konjum Kumari. The film also marked versatile actress Manorama raised to the status of heroine. The film was made by editor-turned-director G. Viswanathan. The film was Modern Theatres' 100th film. T. R. Sundaram's last film. Indira worked along with Sivaji Ganesan and S. S. Rajendran in R. K. S. drama troupe, and with Sivaji Ganesan's stage play named as Thenkkoodu.

Personal life 
Indira's father K. S. Ramasamy was a popular Carnatic singer as well as a stage artiste. Indira is also the elder sister of popular dubbing artist Anuradha and mother of dubbing artist Jayageetha. Indira was married to Shankara Narayanan and they have one daughter, named Jayageetha.

Death 
On 16 March 2017, Indira Devi was admitted to hospital in Chennai for respiratory problems and died following a Cardiac arrest. She was 68 years old. A number of Tamil film celebrities including Secretary Vishal, Vice-president Ponvannan, and General council members Udhaya and Hemachander from Nadigar Sangam visited her place and paid their obeisance.

Award 
 Kalaimamani award by Government of Tamil Nadu.

Partial filmography 
Indira Devi acted in more than 250 films.

Tamil

Kannada

References 

1949 births
2017 deaths
20th-century Indian actresses
Indian film actresses
People from Kanchipuram district
Actresses from Tamil Nadu
Indian stage actresses
Tamil actresses
Actresses in Telugu cinema
Actresses in Kannada cinema